The Sella Pass (or Jouf de Sela) (2218 m) is a high mountain pass between the provinces of Trentino and South Tyrol in Italy.

It connects the Val Gherdëina in South Tyrol and Canazei in the Fascia Valley in Trentino.

With Pordoi Pass, Gardena Pass, and Campolongo Pass, this pass forms a quadrangle around the Sella group. In the winter, ski trails are prepared that make the entire round in both directions, known as the Sella Ronda.

Maratona dles Dolomites 
The Sella Pass is the third of seven Dolomites mountain passes riders cross in the annual Maratona dles Dolomites single-day bicycle race.  It is also on the route of the Dolomites Gold Cup Race.

See also
 List of highest paved roads in Europe
 List of mountain passes

References

External links 
 Passo Sella from Passo Pordoi crossroad
 Passo Sella from the Gardena crossroad

Mountain passes of the Dolomites
Mountain passes of South Tyrol